The British Empire Exhibition was a colonial exhibition held at Wembley Park, London England from 23 April to 1 November 1924 and from 9 May to 31 October 1925.

Background
In 1920 the British Government decided to site the British Empire Exhibition at Wembley Park, on the site of the pleasure gardens created by Edward Watkin in the 1890s. A British Empire Exhibition had first been proposed in 1902, by the British Empire League, and again in 1913. The Russo-Japanese War had prevented the first plan from being developed and World War I put an end to the second, though there had been a Festival of Empire in 1911, held in part at Crystal Palace.

One of the reasons for the suggestion was a sense that other powers, ie America and Japan, were challenging Britain on the world stage. Despite victory in World War I, this was in some ways even truer in 1919. The country had economic problems and its naval supremacy was being challenged by two of its former allies, the USA and Japan. In 1917 Britain had committed itself eventually to leave India, which effectively signalled the end of the British Empire to anyone who thought about the consequences, while the Dominions had shown little interest in following British foreign policy since the war. It was hoped that the Exhibition would strengthen the bonds within the Empire, stimulate trade and demonstrate British greatness both abroad and at home, where the public was believed to be increasingly uninterested in Empire, preferring other distractions, such as the cinema.

Wembley Urban District Council was opposed to the idea, as was The Times, which considered Wembley too far from Central London.

A world tour headed by Major Ernest Belcher in 1922 that lasted 10 months was mounted to promote participation in the Exhibition, with Agatha Christie and her husband among the participants.

The British Empire Exhibition would run from April 1924 to April 1925, closing over the winter, and it made Wembley a household name. In 1919 the Prince of Wales (later Edward VIII) had become the President of the organising committee for the proposed Exhibition at Wembley Park, north-west London, although the closing ceremony was presided over by his brother, the future George VI. The Prince, at the time, also wished for the Exhibition to boast "a great national sports ground", and so exercised some influence on the creation of Wembley Stadium at Wembley Park in 1923.

Empire Stadium 

A purpose-built "great national sports ground", called the Empire Stadium, was built for the Exhibition. This became Wembley Stadium.

The first turf for this stadium was cut, on the site of the old tower, on 10 January 1922. 250,000 tons of earth were then removed, and the new structure constructed within 10 months, opening well before the rest of the Exhibition was ready. Designed by John William Simpson and Maxwell Ayrton, and built by Sir Robert McAlpine, it could hold 125,000 people, 30,000 of them seated. The building was an unusual mix of Roman imperial and Mughal architecture.

Although it incorporated a football pitch, it was not solely intended as a football stadium. Its quarter mile running track, incorporating a 220 yard straight track (the longest in the country) were seen as being at least equally important.

The only standard gauge locomotive involved in the construction of the Stadium has survived, and still runs on Sir William McAlpine's private Fawley Hill railway near Henley.

Exhibition station 
Wembley Park station was rebuilt for the British Empire Exhibition and a new station, Exhibition Station (Wembley), was built on a spur to connect the station to Marylebone. Exhibition station opened on 28 April 1923, the day of Wembley Stadium's first FA cup final. It was later renamed Wembley Exhibition, and then, in February 1928, Wembley Stadium. It was only really used to transport spectators to Wembley events. It stopped carrying passengers in May 1968 and officially closed on 1 September 1969.

Design and construction 
The Exhibition presented a creative challenge, in that its concept required a large number of buildings in a variety of styles. This offered the architects a unique opportunity to experiment. To simplify construction, the main building material used for the Exhibition buildings was reinforced concrete, (then called "ferro-concrete"), selected for its speed of construction. Wembley Park thus earned the title of the first "concrete city" the world had ever seen. Like the stadium, the other exhibition buildings were designed by John William Simpson and Maxwell Ayrton, assisted by engineer Owen Williams. All three had considerable previous experience of using concrete.

Nearly 2,000 men were employed in constructing the Exhibition buildings during 1923-4.

The Indian pavilion had towers and domes, the West African pavilion looked like an Arab fort, the Burmese pavilion was a temple and the South African building reflected the Dutch style.

Aside from the Stadium and major pavilions to house the works of each dominion, colony or group of colonies, there were four other major structures. These were the palaces of Engineering, Industry and Arts, and HM Government Building. All of these palaces can be seen to have had a Roman Imperial character as befitted their political symbolism. At the time, the palaces of Industry and Engineering were world's largest reinforced concrete structures.

The exhibition's roads were named by Rudyard Kipling.

The site was also served by Britain's, and possibly the world's, first bus station, which could handle 100,000 passengers a day.

Opening ceremony 
The British Empire Exhibition was officially opened by King George V on 23 April 1924—Saint George's Day. The opening ceremony was broadcast by BBC Radio, the first such broadcast by a British monarch. The King also sent a telegram that travelled around the world in one minute 20 seconds before being given back to him by a messenger boy.

Exhibits 

Much of the Empire went on display at Wembley Park, but it had to be, of necessity, reduced to a "taster-sized" version. Of the 58 territories which composed the Empire at the time, 56 participated with displays and pavilions, the exceptions being Gambia and Gibraltar. The Irish Free State did not participate either.

The Exhibition's official aim was "to stimulate trade, strengthen bonds that bind mother Country to her Sister States and Daughters, to bring into closer contact the one with each other, to enable all who owe allegiance to the British flag to meet on common ground and learn to know each other". It cost £12 million and was the largest exhibition ever staged anywhere in the world. It attracted 27 million visitors.

Admission cost 1s 6d (p) for adults and 9d (p) for children.

The Palace of Engineering (in 1925 the Palace of Housing & Transport) was the largest exhibition building. It contained a crane capable of moving 25 tons (a practical necessity, not an exhibit) and contained displays on engineering, shipbuilding, electric power, motor vehicles, railways (including locomotives, see below), metallurgy and telegraphs and wireless. In 1925 there seems to have been less emphasis on things that could also be classified as Industry, with instead more on housing and aircraft. The Palace of Industry was slightly smaller. It contained displays on the chemical industry, coal, metals, medicinal drugs, sewage disposal, food, drinks, tobacco, clothing, gramophones, gas and Nobel explosives. Surprisingly the Ulster Pavilion designed by Clough Williams-Ellis was located in the Palace of Industry.

Each colony was assigned its own distinctive pavilion to reflect local culture and architecture. The Canada Pavilion contained displays on minerals, farming, forestry, the paper industry, water power and Canada as a holiday destination, as well as, in the dairy industry section, a full sized figure of the Prince of Wales, the future Edward VIII, sculpted in butter and preserved in a refrigerated case. This pavilion was also flanked by smaller pavilions dedicated to the Canadian National and Canadian Pacific railways. Newfoundland, which did not become part of Canada until 1949, had its own small pavilion next to the HM Government building. The Australian Pavilion boasted a 16-foot diameter ball of Australian wool.

Rather smaller was the pavilion shared by the West Indies and British Guiana, south of the HM Government Pavilion. Each of the West Indian islands had a court in the pavilion, as did the Falkland Islands.

The Malta pavilion was modelled on a fortress with its front entrance looking like the Mdina Gate, and its rear like one of Birgu's gates. It was 3 stories high and had a garden. It was designed by Alberto La Ferla and Joseph Cachia Caruana.

The Palace of Arts, which was fire-proofed, contained historical room sets, as well as painting and sculpture since the eighteenth century. It also displayed the Queen's Dolls House, now at Windsor Castle, which even contained miniature bottles of Bass beer.

Kiosks, located both inside and outside the pavilions, represented individual companies within the Empire, encouraging commercial opportunities. One such was the Pear's Palace of Beauty (see below). Since the Exhibition was the first major event after the war, many firms produced a glut of commemorative items for sale.

The management of the exhibition asked the Imperial Studies Committee of the Royal Colonial Institute to assist them with the educational aspect of the exhibition, which resulted in a 12-volume book, The British Empire: A survey, with Hugh Gunn as the general editor, and which was published in London in 1924.

Railway exhibits 
Several railway companies had display stands at the Exhibition; in some cases they exhibited their latest locomotives or coaches. Among the exhibits in the Palace of Engineering was the now famous railway locomotive, LNER 4472 Flying Scotsman; this was joined in 1925 by GWR 4079 Pendennis Castle. Several other railway locomotives were exhibited: in 1925, the Southern Railway exhibited no. 866 of their N class, which was brand new, not entering service until 28 November 1925. The 1924 exhibition included a Prince of Wales class 4-6-0 locomotive of London & North Western Railway (LNWR) design, which had been built for the exhibition by the Scottish locomotive manufacturer William Beardmore & Company Beardmore's had previously built similar locomotives for the LNWR, which in 1923 had become a constituent of the newly formed London, Midland & Scottish Railway (LMS); when the exhibition closed in November 1924, the LMS bought the locomotive from Beardmore. A Lancashire & Yorkshire Railway designed Baltic Tank 4-6-4T, number 11114, built by the LMS at Horwich Works new was also on display and featured in postcards.

In 1924, the Metropolitan Railway displayed one of its latest Inner Circle cars, a first class driving trailer which had been built in 1923. In 1925, in the Palace of Housing and Transport, the Metropolitan displayed electric locomotive no. 15, with some of the panelling, doors and framework removed from one side, to allow the interior to be viewed; it had been built in 1922. A few years later, it was named Wembley 1924 in honour of the exhibition. Ernest Baguley exhibited their  narrow-gauge locomotive No. 774.

Pears' Palace of Beauty 
The exhibition grounds contained commercial kiosks, run by newspapers, cigarette companies and other businesses. All these structures were designed by the architect Joseph Emberton and his team.

One of the largest kiosks was the Pears' Palace of Beauty, selling souvenir soaps. It was located in the amusement park. The Palace of Beauty was white with two curved staircases leading up to a domed gazebo supported by columns. It was also an exhibition space containing 10 soundproofed, glass-fronted rooms, each containing an actress/model dressed as a beautiful woman from history, with accompanying reproduction furniture. The ten beauties were Helen of Troy, Cleopatra, Scheherazade, Dante's Beatrice, Elizabeth Woodville, Mary Queen of Scots, Nell Gwyn, Madame de Pompadour, the actress Sarah Siddons and 'Miss 1924'. There were also two soap-related characters, Bubbles and The Spirit of Purity.

The Palace, which charged admission, was open 13 hours a day, so each beauty was depicted by two actresses/models working shifts. 14 of the performers were depicted on souvenir postcards. Nearly 750,000 people visited the Palace.

Other attractions 
In addition to the pavilions and kiosks there was a lake, a funfair, a garden and a working replica coal mine. There were also numerous restaurants, the most expensive of which was the Lucullus restaurant (in 1925 the Wembley Garden Club restaurant) near the exhibition gardens. In 1924 J. Lyons held a monopoly of catering, but the restaurant in the Indian Pavilion used Indian cooks and was advised by Edward Palmer "of Messrs. Veeraswami [sic] & Co." to serve as "Indian Adviser at the restaurant." In 1925 Veeraswamy & Co ran the Indian restaurant, despite the fact that, for reasons both economic and political, the Indian Government did not take part in the 1925 season. Veeraswamy & Co later founded the first Indian restaurant aimed at a non-Anglo-Indian white clientele in England.

After admission, most of the attractions in the grounds were free. They could also be explored after dark. The various buildings of the site were linked by two 'light railways' of unusual construction, the screw-propelled "Never-Stop Railway". and the 'Roadrails' line on which trains were hauled by steam or petrol tractors guided by the rails but with driving wheels running on the ground outside the track. Visitors could also travel in electric "Railodok" buses (little more than basic railway station luggage trolleys fitted with open-sided bodywork, but exciting nonetheless).

Events 
The Stadium itself was used extensively for performances by massed bands and choirs, military and historical displays, an Edinburgh-like tattoo, fireworks, the largest ever Boy Scout jamboree, the first Rugby Union match to be played at Wembley, a simulation of an air attack on London (London Defended, see below) and a genuine rodeo which caused some alarm to animal lovers. A highlight was the elaborate "Pageant of Empire" organised by pageant master Frank Lascelles. This involved thousands of actors and was held in the Empire Stadium from 21 July 1924. The newly appointed Master of the King's Musick, Sir Edward Elgar, composed an "Empire March" for it and the music for a series of songs with words by Alfred Noyes.

London Defended

From 9 May to 1 June 1925, No. 32 Squadron RAF flew an air display six nights a week entitled "London Defended". Similar to the display they had done the previous year, when the aircraft were painted black, it consisted of a night time air display over the Wembley Exhibition flying RAF Sopwith Snipes which were painted red for the display and fitted with white lights on the wings, tail and fuselage. The display involved firing blank ammunition into the stadium crowds and dropping pyrotechnics from the aeroplanes to simulate shrapnel from guns on the ground, Explosions on the ground also produced the effect of bombs being dropped into the stadium by the Aeroplanes. One of the Pilots in the display was Flying officer C. W. A. Scott who later became famous for breaking three England-Australia solo flight records and winning the MacRobertson Air Race with co-pilot Tom Campbell Black in 1934.

Philately and numismatics 

The Exhibition is of philatelic interest, as it was the first occasion for which the British Post Office issued commemorative postage stamps. Two stamps were issued on 23 April 1924: a 1d in scarlet, and a d in brown, both being inscribed "British Empire Exhibition 1924"; they were designed by H. Nelson. A second printing, identical to the first apart from the year being changed to 1925, was issued on 9 May 1925. A List of Great Britain commemorative stamps gives further details of British commemorative postage stamps. Envelopes, letter cards, postcards and many other souvenirs commemorating the event were produced as well.

A significant number of medals were struck for the Exhibition, both by the organisers and by commercial organisations.

Commercial outcome 
Despite providing a wealth of entertainment, the Exhibition was not a financial success. Despite 18 million visitors in 1924, the project ended that season without breaking even. In an attempt to raise enough money, the late decision was taken to reopen, with some variations, in 1925, but the Exhibition did not do as well in its second season. It closed for good on 31 October 1925, having received 27 million visitors in two years. The final cost reached in excess of £6 million. Variety claimed that it was the world's biggest outdoor failure, costing the UK Government $90 million (over £20 million based on the exchange rates at the time).

Two of the most popular attractions were US dodgem cars and a copy of the tomb of Tutankhamen. Both of these were in the funfair, with the tomb there because Egypt was no longer a British Protectorate, having been independent since 1922. Pelham Grenville Wodehouse's fictional Bertie Wooster may have reflected genuine reactions to the Exhibition in preferring the Green Swizzles at the Planters Bar to anything more didactic.

Survival of stadium 
Most of the exhibition halls were intended to be temporary and demolished afterwards, but, partly because of the high cost of demolishing such huge concrete structures, the Palace of Engineering and the British Government Pavilion survived into the 1970s, and the Palace of Industry and the sacred art section of the Palace of Arts until the 2010s. At the suggestion of the chair of the exhibition committee, Scotsman Sir James Stevenson, and thanks to the intervention of Arthur Elvin, who had been contracted to clear the exhibition site, the Empire Stadium was retained. It became Wembley Stadium, the home of Football in England until 2003, when it was demolished to be replaced by a new stadium.

Influence on development of Wembley 
The British Empire Exhibition inevitably led to increased suburban development. An outfall sewer was built to serve the Exhibition and a number of roads in the area were straightened and widened, and new road signs installed. In addition, new bus services were introduced to serve the Exhibition. Visitors to the Exhibition were introduced to Wembley and some were later encouraged to move to the area when houses had been built to accommodate them. Conversely, though the Exhibition encouraged the development of Wembley as a typical inter-war suburb, the survival of the Stadium ensured that the Empire Exhibition grounds in Wembley Park would remain a major London visitor destination.

In popular culture
The Exhibition is a key location in the P.G. Wodehouse short story, "The Rummy Affair of Old Biffy", in which Sir Roderick Glossop describes it as "the most supremely absorbing and educational collection of objects, both animate and inanimate, gathered from the four corners of the Empire, that has ever been assembled in England's history." Bertie Wooster is somewhat less impressed, remarking that "millions of people, no doubt, are so constituted that they scream with joy and excitement at the spectacle of a stuffed porcupine-fish or a glass jar of seeds from Western Australia – but not Bertram" and sneaks off to the Planters' Bar in the West Indian section for a Green Swizzle.

The British Empire Exhibition features in David Lean's 1944 film This Happy Breed, starring Celia Johnson.

In Sir John Betjeman's celebrated Metro-Land (1973) the poet recalls his childhood experience of the exhibition in the "Wembley" segment.

In Charlie Higson's Young Bond novel SilverFin (Puffin, 2005), the young James Bond is impressed by the height of the rollercoaster at the British Empire Exhibition in 1925.

The Exhibition features in the opening scene of the 2010 film The King's Speech. The film is based on the future George VI's relationship with speech therapist Lionel Logue following his speech at the Exhibition on 31 October 1925, which proved to be highly embarrassing due to his pronounced stammer.

The popular British drama Downton Abbey featured a storyline where the members of the Crawley family and their servants jointly listen to the radio for the very first time - it was an address of the King at the British Empire Exhibition.

See also 
Colonial Exhibitions
Colonialism

References

Bibliography 
Barres-Baker, M.C., "Secret History Historical Beauties" in Brent Magazine, Issue 130 (February - March 2013), p. 27
Cohen, S., "The Empire from the Street: Virginia Woolf, Wembley, and Imperial Monuments" in Modern Fiction Studies, Vol. 50, Number 1 (Spring 2004), pp. 85–109
Davis, A., "A Study in Modernism: the Group of Seven as an Unexpectedly Typical Case" in Journal of Canadian Studies, Spring 1998
Geppert, Alexander C.T., Fleeting Cities. Imperial Expositions in Fin-de-Siècle Europe, Basingstoke/New York: Palgrave Macmillan, 2010
 Geppert, Alexander C.T., 'True Copies. Time and Space Travels at British Imperial Exhibitions, 1880-1930', in The Making of Modern Tourism. The Cultural History of the British Experience, 1600-2000, eds. Hartmut Berghoff et al., Basingstoke/New York: Palgrave Macmillan, 2002, pp. 223–48
 Goswamy, B.M., Art and Soul: Exhibiting the Empire (The Tribune Online, 5 September 2004)
 Green, Oliver. Metroland : British Empire Exhibition Number, Southbank Publishing, 2015
 Harris, Trevor I., The medals and medallions of the British Empire Exhibition Wembley 1924 - 1925, T.I. Harris, 2003? 
 Hewlett, Geoffrey, A History of Wembley, Wembley: Brent Library Service, 1979
 Hughes, D.L., 'Kenya, India and the British Empire Exhibition of 1924' in Race & Class, Vol. 47 No. 4 (2006) pp. 66–85
 Knight, Donald R. & Sabey, Alan D., The Lion Roars at Wembley, privately published by D.R. Knight, New Barnet, 1984. 
 McKinnon, J.S., 'A Canadian's View of the Empire as Seen From London' in The Empire Club of Canada Speeches 1926 (The Empire Club of Canada, 1927) pp. 102–115
 Maxwell, Donald, Wembley in colour: being both an impression and a memento of the British Empire Exhibition of 1924 as seen by Donald Maxwell, Longmans, Green & Co., 1924
 Parsons, S.R., "The British Empire Exhibition: A Study in Geography, Resources, and Citizenship of the British Empire" in The Empire Club of Canada Speeches 1924 (The Empire Club of Canada, 1924) pp. 285–300
 Perkins, Mike & Tonkin, Bill, Postcards of the British Empire Exhibition Wembley 1924 and 1925, Exhibition Study Group, 1994 
 Stephen, Daniel, 'Brothers of the Empire? India and the British Empire Exhibition of 1924-25' in Twentieth Century British History, Vol. 22, No. 2, 2011, pp. 164–188
 Stephen, Daniel, The Empire of Progress: West Africans, Indians, and Britons at the British Empire Exhibition, 1924–25, Palgrave Macmillan, 2013 
 Stephen, Daniel, 'The White Man's Grave: the Gold Coast, Sierra Leone, and Nigeria at the British Empire Exhibition, 1924-1925' in Journal of British Studies 48 (1) (January 2009) pp. 102–128
 Walthew, K., 'The British Empire Exhibition of 1924' in History Today, Vol. 31 Issue 8 (August 1981) pp. 34–39
 Wembley History Society, The British Empire Exhibition, Wembley, 1924 : fiftieth anniversary, Wembley History Society, 1974
 Wembley History Society Journal: Special Edition 1974 - British Empire Exhibition 1924
 Woodham, J, "Images of Africa and Design at the British Empire Exhibitions between the Wars" in Journal of Design History, Vol. 2, No. 1 (1989), pp. 15–33
 Woolf, Virginia, "Thunder at Wembley" in The Captain's Death Bed and Other Essays (various editions)

External links 

British Empire Exhibitions 1924-1925 - Exploring 20th century London
Philip Grant - The British Empire Exhibition, 1924/5
British Empire Exhibitions 1924-1925 - Exploring 20th century London
Clendinning, Anne, 'On The British Empire Exhibition, 1924-25' on BRANCH: Britain, Representation, and Nineteenth-Century History website
Remains of the British Empire Exhibition
Alan Sabey - The British Empire Exhibition, Wembley A Diary of Royal Visits and other Notable Events in 1924 Part 1
Alan Sabey - The British Empire Exhibition, Wembley A Diary of Royal Visits and other Notable Events in 1924 Part 2
Philip Grant - Sierra Leone at the British Empire Exhibition in 1924
Philip Grant - When Nigeria came to Wembley, 1924
Wembley Park's Heritage Page
Exhibition Study Group website
Barbara Potter Collection at the National Gallery of Canada, Ottawa, Ontario

1924 in international relations
1924 in London
1924 in the British Empire
1925 in international relations
1925 in London
1925 in the British Empire
20th century in Middlesex
History of the London Borough of Brent
Exhibition
World's fairs in London
Events at Wembley Stadium
Colonial exhibitions
1924 festivals